X-PLOR is a computer software package for computational structural biology originally developed by Axel T. Brunger at Yale University. It was first published in 1987 as an offshoot of CHARMM - a similar program that ran on supercomputers made by Cray Inc. It is used in the fields of X-ray crystallography and nuclear magnetic resonance spectroscopy of proteins (NMR) analysis. 

X-PLOR is a highly sophisticated program that provides an interface between theoretical foundations and experimental data in structural biology, with specific emphasis on X-ray crystallography and nuclear magnetic resonance spectroscopy in solution of biological macro-molecules. It is intended mainly for researchers and students in the fields of computational chemistry, structural biology, and computational molecular biology.

See also
Comparison of software for molecular mechanics modeling
Molecular mechanics

References

External links
The program's reference manual hosted at Oxford University

Molecular dynamics software
Computer libraries